My BFF is a 2014 Philippine television drama comedy series broadcast by GMA Network. It premiered on the network's Telebabad line up from June 30, 2014, to October 4, 2014, replacing My Love from the Star.

Mega Manila ratings are provided by AGB Nielsen Philippines.

Series overview

Episodes

June 2014

July 2014

August 2014

September 2014

October 2014

Episodes notes

References

Lists of Philippine drama television series episodes